The Prime Minister's Delivery Unit (PMDU) was a center of government institution in the United Kingdom, providing support to the Prime Minister on public service delivery. It was created in June 2001 to monitor progress on and strengthen the British government's capacity to deliver on key campaign priorities of Prime Minister Tony Blair's second-term government: education, health, crime and transport. The Unit reported to the Prime Minister through the Head of the Civil Service (the Cabinet Secretary). The Unit was abolished in 2010.

It was headed by the Prime Minister's Chief Adviser on Delivery, who was initially Professor Sir Michael Barber. He left in mid-2005 and was replaced by Ian Watmore, the head of the Cabinet Office Delivery and Transformation Group, in January 2006. Following Ian Watmore's departure in mid-2007, Ray Shostak CBE was appointed to the lead the unit. It worked alongside the Prime Minister's Strategy Unit.

The Unit worked in partnership with the HM Treasury, 10 Downing Street, the Cabinet Office and stakeholder departments within the Government of the United Kingdom, to assess delivery and provide performance management for the Government's top public priorities. From 2006 to 2010, the Unit was also jointly responsible for monitoring performance across all the indicators in the Public service agreements.

The Unit was abolished by the Coalition Government in October 2010, with remaining staff re-allocated to the Performance and Reform Unit in HM Treasury. Public Service Agreements were also abolished in June 2010. Ray Shostak left the Unit in December 2010 to join Core Assets Group. Ian Watmore, a former chief executive of the Football Association, was appointed Chief Operating Officer of the Efficiency and Reform Group in June 2010.

See also 

 Prime Minister's Office

References 

Public bodies and task forces of the United Kingdom government
British Prime Minister's Office
2001 establishments in the United Kingdom
2010 disestablishments in the United Kingdom